Kinkler is an unincorporated community in Lavaca County, Texas, United States.

History
Kinkler is named for Jack Kinkler, who settled in the area in 1875. The community had a school by 1880 and a post office by 1885; the post office closed in 1905. Due to its proximity to Hallettsville and Schulenberg, Kinkler never had a significant commercial district; its first listing in the Texas Almanac, in 1933, listed two businesses there. As of 2000, the community's population was 75.

References

Unincorporated communities in Lavaca County, Texas
Unincorporated communities in Texas